Kenkichi Iwasawa ( Iwasawa Kenkichi, September 11, 1917 – October 26, 1998) was a Japanese mathematician who is known for his influence on algebraic number theory.

Biography 
Iwasawa was born in Shinshuku-mura, a town near Kiryū, in Gunma Prefecture. He attended elementary school there, but later moved to Tokyo to attend Musashi High School.

From 1937 to 1940 Iwasawa studied as an undergraduate at Tokyo Imperial University, after which he entered graduate school at University of Tokyo and became an assistant in the Department of Mathematics. In 1945 he was awarded a Doctor of Science degree. However, this same year Iwasawa became sick with pleurisy, and was unable to return to his position at the university until April 1947. From 1949 to 1955 he worked as assistant professor at Tokyo University.

In 1950, Iwasawa was invited to Cambridge, Massachusetts to give a lecture at the International Congress of Mathematicians on his method to study Dedekind zeta functions using integration over ideles and duality of adeles; this method was also independently obtained by John Tate and is sometimes called Iwasawa–Tate theory. Iwasawa spent the next two years at the Institute for Advanced Study in Princeton, and in Spring of 1952 was offered a job at the Massachusetts Institute of Technology, where he worked until 1967.

From 1967 until his retirement in 1986, Iwasawa served as Professor of Mathematics at Princeton. He returned to Tokyo with his wife in 1987.

Among Iwasawa's most famous students are Robert F. Coleman, Bruce Ferrero, Ralph Greenberg, Gustave Solomon, Larry Washington, and Eugene M. Luks.

Research
Iwasawa is known for introducing what is now called Iwasawa theory, which developed from researches on cyclotomic fields from the later 1950s. Before that he worked on Lie groups and Lie algebras, introducing the general Iwasawa decomposition.

List of books available in English
Lectures on p-adic L-functions / by Kenkichi Iwasawa (1972)
Local class field theory / Kenkichi Iwasawa (1986) 
Algebraic functions / Kenkichi Iwasawa ; translated by Goro Kato (1993)

See also 
 Iwasawa group
 Anabelian geometry
 Fermat's Last Theorem

References

Sources

External links
 

1917 births
1998 deaths
People from Gunma Prefecture
20th-century Japanese mathematicians
Number theorists
Institute for Advanced Study visiting scholars
Massachusetts Institute of Technology faculty
Princeton University faculty
University of Tokyo alumni